Daniel Stephen Caines (born 15 May 1979) is an English former athlete who mainly competed in the 400 metres.

Early life
Caines was born in Solihull. He was educated at Solihull School, a British independent school in the affluent West Midlands town of Solihull. He has a Kittian descent and grew up with an Adventist background.

Athletics career
In addition to winning medals in individual contests, he has been a fairly successful relay runner.

Achievements

Personal bests
 200 metres – 20.84 s (2003)
 400 metres – 44.98 s (2002)

External links
 

1979 births
Living people
English male sprinters
Olympic athletes of Great Britain
Athletes (track and field) at the 2000 Summer Olympics
Athletes (track and field) at the 2004 Summer Olympics
People educated at Solihull School
Commonwealth Games gold medallists for England
Athletes (track and field) at the 2002 Commonwealth Games
Birchfield Harriers
European Athletics Championships medalists
English sportspeople of Saint Kitts and Nevis descent
Commonwealth Games medallists in athletics
World Athletics Indoor Championships winners
World Athletics Indoor Championships medalists
Medallists at the 2002 Commonwealth Games